The Eden Valley Railway (EVR) is a standard gauge heritage railway in Cumbria, England. It runs over a  section of the original Eden Valley Railway in a north-westerly direction from the line's base at Warcop station. The line is run by the Eden Valley Railway Trust, formerly the Eden Valley Railway Society.

The railway operates passenger trains from March to September on the weekends and Bank Holidays and some weekday workings in summer.

History 
The original Eden Valley Railway opened in 1862, linking Penrith and Kirkby Stephen via Appleby-in-Westmorland. Passenger traffic ended in 1962 and the line was reduced to the track between the junction at Appleby station with the Settle-Carlisle Line and Kirkby Stephen which served a quarry. It was used by infrequent British Army services to Warcop Training Area until 1989.

In 1995 the Eden Valley Railway Society was formed with the primary objective of restoring the Warcop to Appleby section of the line, and a secondary object of, if possible, extending it to Kirkby Stephen once the initial section was in operation. On 3 August 2004 the Eden Valley Railway Order 2004 came into action, allowing the trust to undertake railway operations (excluding non-self generated electrical railways) on the  track from Appleby to Flitholme near Warcop.

Rolling stock

The Eden Valley Railway has mostly ex-British Rail built rolling stock, including British Rail Class 205 diesel-electric multiple unit no. 205 009, British Rail Class 411 electric multiple units nos. 2311 and 2315 and British Rail Class 419 units nos. 9003, 9005 and 9010. The railway also operates a British Rail Class 37 English Electric diesel-electric locomotive, no. 37 042, and Brush Traction Type 4 Class 47 diesel-electric locomotive, no. 47799, which sometimes hauled the British Royal Train from 1990 to 2004, during which time it was named Prince Henry. Also on site are several ex industrial shunters: Robert Stephenson & Hawthorn 8343 ( "Darlington"), Fowler 4220045, Hunslet 2389, Thomas Hill 130c and Drewry Cars 2181 in addition to a number of freight wagons and a 15-ton railway crane.

The Railway does have a steam locomotive, in the form of industrial  "Askham Hall". The former Lakeside and Haverthwaite Railway locomotive is currently at Threlkeld Quarry and Mining Museum having asbestos removed.

References

External links

The Eden Valley Railway official website www.evr-cumbria.org.uk
The Eden Valley Railway www.visitcumbria.com
Warcop Station and the Eden Valley Railway

Heritage railways in Cumbria